Mohamad Ramadhan bin Ab. Hamid (born 16 February 1994) is a Malaysian professional footballer who currently plays as a goalkeeper for Malaysia Super League club PDRM.

Club career

Youth teams
Ramadhan began his career with Kelantan youth team in 2012  at the age of 18. In 2013, Ramadhan moved to Malaysia U21 club Harimau Muda B on loan deal and has played for Singaporean league, S.League. He made his S.League debut on 26 June 2013, playing the full 90 minutes in a 2–0 loss to Geylang International at the Bedok Stadium. Ramadhan has made 4 appearances and 10 unused substitute during his season debut.

Kelantan
On 25 November 2015, Ramadhan returned to Kelantan after disbanded of the Harimau Muda.
 
 Upon joining the club, Ramadhan was given a number one shirt last wore by Syazwan Yusoff during 2015 season before he loaned out to Melaka United in 2016 season. Ramadhan did not make any appearances during his first season with Kelantan and spent the entire season sitting on the bench became the second choice goalkeeper after Khairul Fahmi Che Mat. On 1 March 2017, Ramadhan made his debut playing against Perak during league match in Perak Stadium. He conceded 2 goals and the match end up Kelantan won by 4–2.

On 4 March 2017, Ramadhan made his Kelantan's home debut in Sultan Muhammad IV Stadium playing against Kuala Terengganu based club, T-Team. He made it to the first eleven and  helped his team clinch their first home victory with 4−2 score.

On 5 July 2017, made his debut for during the first match of the Malaysia Cup campaign playing against UiTM in their home ground. Kelantan won by 3–1 during that match.

On 11 November 2017, Ramadhan has been announced to remain seasonally with Kelantan for the 2018 season. This time around he were given jersey number 22. Ramadhan played in first league match for Kelantan in 2–1 defeat to Melaka United on 3 February 2018.

Kedah
After losing his position as first choice goalkeeper under new coach Fajr Ibrahim, Ramadhan joined Kedah in May 2018. Ramadhan made his debut for Kedah in a 1–0 win over Kelantan on 8 June 2018.

Penang, Kelantan United and UiTM
He later signed for Penang F.C. for the 2020 season, before returning to Kelantan to play for Kelantan United F.C. for the 2021 season. Ramadhan changed teams again the following season, this time joining UiTM FC for the 2022 season.

International career
On 7 September 2015, Ramadhan was selected to represent Malaysia at the 2018 FIFA World Cup qualification match against Saudi Arabia. Somehow, he only spent time on the bench during the match.

Career statistics

Club

1 Includes Malaysia FA Cup and Singapore Cup matches.
2 Includes Malaysia Cup and Singapore League Cup matches.

Honours

Kedah Darul Aman
 Malaysia FA Cup: 2019
 Malaysia Cup runner-up: 2019

Penang
 Malaysia Premier League: 2020

References

External links
 
 

1994 births
Living people
Malaysian people of Malay descent
People from Kelantan
Malaysian footballers
Malaysia international footballers
Kelantan FA players
Penang F.C. players
Malaysia Super League players
Association football goalkeepers
Kedah Darul Aman F.C. players
Kelantan United F.C. players
UiTM FC players